Tokyo 8th district (東京都第8区, Tōkyō-to dai-hachiku or simply 東京8区, Tōkyō-hachiku) is a single-member constituency of the House of Representatives in the national Diet of Japan. It is located in western part of former Tokyo City and is almost coterminous with Suginami Ward (a small area in the south-east is part of the Tokyo 7th district). The district was created in 1994 as part of an electoral reform effort in the Japanese House of Representatives, and was first implemented in the 1996 general election.

As of 2015, this district was home to 365,194 constituents.

Before a series of electoral reforms in 1994, Suginami Ward had been part of Tokyo 4th district, where five representatives had been elected by single non-transferable vote.

From the creation of the district until 2021, the only representative for the district was Nobuteru Ishihara, a former LDP secretary-general and Minister of the Environment who headed his own faction and is the son of Shintarō Ishihara former Governor of Tōkyō. Ishihara lost
the seat to Harumi Yoshida, a university professor, in the 2021 elections. Tarō Yamamoto, leader of the Reiwa Shinsengumi, had announced he'd run in the district, but he bowed out and endorsed Yoshida.

List of representatives

Election results

In popular culture
The 8th district is featured in the fifth season of the anime Aggretsuko, with the main character Retsuko running for election to the district for the Rage Party against her boyfriend Haida's brother Jiro to succeed his father Juzo.

References 

Districts of the House of Representatives (Japan)
Politics of Tokyo